The Clarion snake eel (Myrichthys pantostigmius) is an eel in the family Ophichthidae (worm/snake eels). It was described by David Starr Jordan and Ernest Alexander McGregor in 1898. It is a tropical, marine eel which is known from Mexico, in the eastern central Pacific Ocean. It inhabits shallow waters - at a maximum depth of 20 metres - and is found around rocks and sand. Males can reach a maximum total length of 49.4 centimetres.

Due to a lack of known threats and a lack of observed population decline, the IUCN redlist currently lists the Clarion snake eel as Least Concern.

References

Clarion snake eel
Clarion snake eel
Western Central American coastal fauna
Clarion snake eel
Taxa named by David Starr Jordan